This is a chronological, but still incomplete, list of United States federal legislation. Congress has enacted approximately 200–600 statutes during each of its 115 biennial terms so that more than 30,000 statutes have been enacted since 1789.

At the federal level in the United States, legislation (i.e., "statutes" or "statutory law") consists exclusively of Acts passed by the Congress of the United States and its predecessor, the Continental Congress, that were either signed into law by the President or passed by Congress after a presidential veto.

Legislation is not the only source of regulations with the force of law. However, most executive branch and judicial branch regulations must originate in a congressional grant of power. See also: Executive orders issued by the President; Code of Federal Regulations for rules issued by executive branch departments and administrative agencies; and the Federal Rules of Civil Procedure of the federal courts.

Publication of the law

Statutes at Large (Stat.)
Acts of Congress are published in the United States Statutes at Large. Volumes 1 through 18, which have all the statutes passed from 1789 to 1875, are available on-line at the Library of Congress, here. In the list below, statutes are listed by X Stat. Y, where X is the volume of the Statutes at Large and Y is the page number, as well as either the chapter or Public Law number. See examples below.

Sessions (Sess.) and Chapters (ch.)
Each Congress has two to four sessions.  Under the numbering system used from 1789 until 1957, the Acts in each session are numbered sequentially as Chapters. This numbering included both laws applicable to the general public and laws relating to specific individuals, e.g., to grant pensions to disabled veterans.

Examples
 The Militia Act of 1862 of July 17, 1862, Sess. 2, ch. 201, was the 201st Act of the second session of the 37th Congress.
 The National Banking Act of February 25, 1863, Sess. 3, ch. 58, was the 58th Act of the third session of the 37th Congress.
 The Global Anti-Semitism Review Act of 2004 of October 16, 2004, was the 332nd Act of Congress (statute) passed in the 108th Congress. It can be found in volume 118 of the U.S. Statutes at Large, starting at page 1282.
 The Help America Vote Act of October 29, 2002, was the 252nd Act of the 107th Congress. It can be found in volume 116 of the U.S. Statutes at Large, starting at page 1666.

Congress of the Confederation

 September 22, 1783: Confederation Congress Proclamation of 1783 
 April 23, 1784: Land Ordinance of 1784
 May 21, 1785: Land Ordinance of 1785
 July 13, 1787: Ordinance of 1787: The Northwest Territorial Government ("Northwest Ordinance")

United States Congress

1789 to 1901: 1st through 56th Congresses

1901 to 2001: 57th through 106th Congresses

2001 to present: 107th and subsequent Congresses

See also
 Authorization bill
 Appropriations bill (United States)
 List of sources of law in the United States
 List of Uniform Acts (United States)
 Lists by subject
 Agriculture: United States Department of Agriculture#Related legislation
 Civil Rights: Civil Rights Act (disambiguation)
 Defense: United States Department of Defense#Related legislation
 Drugs: Office of National Drug Control Policy#Legislation and executive orders
 Energy: United States Department of Energy#Related legislation and Energy law#Federal laws
Environment: United States Environmental Protection Agency#Related legislation
 Health and Human Services: United States Department of Health and Human Services#Related legislation
 Judiciary: Judiciary Act (disambiguation)
 Labor: United States Department of Labor#Related legislation
 Slavery: Slave Trade Acts
 Social Security: List of Social Security legislation (United States)
 Taxation: List of tariffs, :Template:US tax acts, and :Category:United States federal taxation legislation
 Transportation: United States Department of Transportation#Related legislation
 Veterans Affairs: United States Department of Veterans Affairs#Related legislation
 Water Resources, Navigation, Environmental Regulation: United States Army Corps of Engineers#Public Laws affecting the Corps of Engineers (partial)

Sources
 Acts listed by popular name, via Cornell University
 Statutes at Large
 Volumes 1 through 18, 1789–1875, via Library of Congress
 Volumes 19 through 64, 1875-1950, via Library of Congress
 Volumes 65 through 127, 1951-2013, via Government Publishing Office
 Public laws
 93rd Congress through current Congress, via Congress.gov
 U.S. Code
 U.S. Code, via Law Revision Counsel of the U.S. House of Representatives
 U.S. Code, via Cornell University
 U.S. Code, via the U.S. Government Publishing Office
 U.S. Code, via FindLaw.com
Brian K. Landsberg (ed), Major Acts of Congress. MacMillan Reference Books (December 2003)

References

 

 
Legislation
Federal
Legislation
Federal legislation